Marion Wesley Easterling (March 12, 1910 - December 10, 1989) was an American music composer in the genre of southern gospel who claimed he had written around 300 songs. His compositions include  "When I Wake Up To Sleep No More",  "Lord Lead Me On",  "Standing By The River", "Rainbow Of Love", and "When He Reached Down His Hand For Me".

Biography 
Marion Wesley Easterling was born in  Chilton County, Alabama on March 12, 1910. He attended the public schools in Chilton County and then attended various music schools including the Vaughan School of Music.  He also took correspondence courses from New York and Chicago to further his musical education.  His first song to become a hit was "Lord Lead Me On" written in 1937.  Other hit songs written by Easterling include "Standing By The River", "Rainbow Of Love", "When He Reached Down His Hand For Me", and "When I Wake Up To Sleep No More".  In 1938, Easterling was the youngest composer to sign a five year contract with Stamps-Baxter Music Company. 

Easterling also brought gospel music through the media of radio to Chilton County. He hosted a morning gospel show "America's Favorites" on WKLF radio station in Clanton, Alabama.  His first broadcast was on December 2, 1947 and it became the nation’s longest continuously-running daily Gospel radio program.  He was awarded the Broadcast Media Gospel Award in 1976.  Easterling died December 10, 1989 in a Birmingham, Alabama hospital and is buried in Martin Memorial Cemetery in Clanton, Alabama.

References

Footnotes

Sources
1986 Congressional Record, Vol. 132, Pages S7952-7953
The Montgomery Advertiser, December 12, 1989, Page 6C.  Retrieved May 29, 2022.
Love, Joyanna. "WKLF celebrating 70 years of broadcasting", The Clanton Advertiser, February 1, 2019.  Retrieved June 4, 2022.  WKLF celebrating 70 years of broadcasting

External links

1910 births
1989 deaths
20th-century American composers
People from Clanton, Alabama
Southern gospel
Gospel music composers
Singer-songwriters from Alabama
Musicians from Birmingham, Alabama
Radio personalities from Alabama
Guinness World Records